Josh Cullen Santos (born October 22, 1993), better known by his mononym Josh, is a Filipino  singer, producer, songwriter, dancer, and a professional gamer. He is the lead rapper and sub-vocalist of the Filipino boy band SB19 managed under ShowBT Philippines.

Early life 
Josh was born on October 22, 1993 in Las Piñas, Metro Manila, Philippines to Aldrene Stephanie Santos. He is the youngest in the family along with two sisters. He revealed on a YouTube vlog that a single mother raised him and he never met his biological father. In the same tell-all vlog, Santos revealed that he was a victim of domestic violence by their nanny while their mother was at work. Santos and family struggled financially leading to his intermittent schooling, and graduated high school at a later age. After graduating, Santos worked as a computer technician and a call center agent prior to auditioning as a talent.

Career

2016-2018: Pre-debut 
In 2016, South Korean entertainment company ShowBT branched out in the Philippines and opened a talent audition for Filipinos aspiring to become professional performers. Santos was among the participants, and was chosen later on for a 5-piece boy band. Santos then underwent South Korean-style training that is rampant for K-Pop bands prior to debut, which included voice and dance classes, body conditioning, personality development, and the like. On several accounts, the SB19 members recalled how rigorous the sessions were wherein hours of nonstop and unpaid training daily while juggling with their work. But more than the training, it was the threat of failing their weekly evaluation and the possibility of being eliminated. According to Santos in an interview,

During his training, he drew inspirations from Filipino hip hop artists Loonie, Gloc-9, Shanti Dope, and Smugglaz. He also admired the styles of Bigbang's G-Dragon, and BTS.

2018-2022: Debut as SB19 and breakthrough 

On 26 October 2018, Santos debuted with fellow members Pablo, Stell, Justin, and Ken as P-Pop group known as SB19. Their first single "Tilaluha" was written by fellow member Pablo but its success was not widely acclaimed. With a message centered on heartbreak and unrequited love, the song was intended to introduce the band and their powerful vocals in which it debuted poorly to charts. The initial poor reception for the group and their singles leads to them almost splitting up. SB19's second single "Go Up" was released on July 19, 2019. They described the song as their "last shot" because they had decided to disband if their career did not progress after. Unexpectedly, they gained public attention after the dance practice video of the song was uploaded which was later shared by a fan on Twitter and Facebook. Opportunities opened and the group started to appear in multiple radio and television outlets, both local and internationally. On 2021, SB19 became the first Filipino and Southeast Asian act to be nominated in Billboard Music Awards for Top Social Artist along with BTS, Blackpink, Ariana Grande, and Seventeen—which BTS won. It marked the first-ever appearance of a Filipino artist in the Billboard Music Awards.

In 2022, Santos joined his independent musician cousins Ocho the Bullet and Carrot Mayor on their track "Sofa (Remix)", released on YouTube and Apple Music.

2023-present: Wild Tonight, debut as solo artist 
On February 24, Josh Cullen debut as solo artist, record producer, song writer and composer. He released a single "WILD TONIGHT", a Victorian themes and vampire-inspired concept combines with the elements of EDM, pop, and hip-hop. The single was the result of artistic pursuit: a pulse of liberating joy that reveals a facet of Josh’s personality beyond celebrityhood and public perception. Josh acknowledges that he is heavily involved in the creative process, from brainstorming and refining music ideas to writing lyrics and composing melodies, and even getting himself into co-producing the material with Ace Santos, his cousin.

Discography

As a lead artist

Production credits 
All song credits are adapted from the Tidal, unless otherwise noted.

Awards and nominations

References 

SB19 members
1993 births
Living people
Filipino singer-songwriters
English-language singers from the Philippines
21st-century Filipino male singers
Filipino male pop singers
Filipino male dancers
Filipino male models
Filipino dance musicians
Sony Music Philippines artists
ShowBT Entertainment artists